Qareh Poshtelu-e Pain Rural District is in Qareh Poshtelu District of Zanjan County, Zanjan province, Iran. At the National Census of 2006, its population was 3,238 in 684 households. There were 2,654 inhabitants in 669 households at the following census of 2011. At the most recent census of 2016, the population of the rural district was 2,324 in 733 households. The largest of its 33 villages was Hajj Siran, with 321 people.

References 

Zanjan County

Rural Districts of Zanjan Province

Populated places in Zanjan Province

Populated places in Zanjan County